Fang and Claw was Frank Buck’s third book, which continued his stories of  capturing exotic animals.
Writing with Ferrin Fraser, Buck related many of his experiences working with and observing other people in the jungle.

Contents
In one chapter, a dog that was carried dozens of miles into the jungle to serve as tiger bait succeeded in making so good an impression on the way to the trap that he came to be considered more valuable than a tiger. Buck tells how he himself caught a huge orangutan, whose favorite dish was a molasses sandwich. A jungle necessity, according to Buck, is liquid soap. After rain or even an excessive heavy dew bushes are full of leeches ready to fasten onto any passer-by. Once these creatures take hold they bury their heads and the only way to get rid of them is to burn them out with a lighted cigarette end. But leeches don't like the odor or taste of liquid soap and will seldom burrow through a layer of it to get at the skin. Buck derides little men with big rifles who kill jungle animals, especially elephants, and ranks these men as killers lower than cobras.

Critical reception
"He is one of the rare articulate adventurers who has the good sense not to be forever asserting that he is the fellow who shot the bear...Those who find the title attractive may
safely hope for entertainment in the book."

References

1935 non-fiction books
Hunting in popular culture
American travel books
Books about cats
Collaborative non-fiction books